The Shropshire flag is the county flag of Shropshire. It was registered with the Flag Institute in March 2012 and officially became the county's flag on 19 April 2013. 



History
The flag is a banner of the arms of the former Shropshire (or Salop) County Council which were awarded in 1895. The leopards' faces, referred to as "loggerheads" locally, are a traditional emblem for Shropshire and several of its towns. It is believed that the loggerheads derive from the Royal Arms of England and that the blue and yellow colours represent those of Roger de Montgomery, Earl of Shrewsbury. Loggerheads also appeared
on the Shrewsbury town arms, themselves first recorded in 1623, solidifying their connections to the local area. The name is thought to have originated from the practice of carving such a design on the head of the log used as a battering ram. The "gold" erminois aspect differentiates the county arms/flag from those of its county town.

The flag (with the short-lived "white" ermine pattern instead of the erminois) was flown above the Department for Communities and Local Government in April 2011 as part of a scheme to promote traditional English counties.

On 23 July 2019, the flag of Shropshire was flown among others in Parliament Square in celebration of Historic County Flags Day.

Design
Erminois, three piles issuant two from chief and one from base each bearing a leopard's head.

The Pantone colours for the flag are:
Reflex Blue
Yellow
Black

References

External links
[ Flag Institute – Shropshire]

Shropshire
Shropshire
Shropshire
Shropshire